"Tonight" is the thirteenth single by Japanese rock band Luna Sea, released on May 17, 2000. The song reached number 4 on the Oricon Singles Chart, and charted for eight weeks.

Overview
The promotional video for "Tonight" was directed by Shūichi Tan, who previously directed the video for "Gravity". It features model and actor Enrique Sakamoto.

The song has been covered live by J at some of his solo concerts. It was also used as the theme for WOWOW's broadcast of the UEFA Euro 2000

Track listing
All songs written and composed by Luna Sea.

"Tonight" - 3:02Originally written and composed by J.
"Be Gone" - 5:11Originally composed by Inoran.
"Be in Agony" - 4:19Originally composed by Inoran.

References

Luna Sea songs
2000 singles
2000 songs